In computer science and graph theory, the zero-weight cycle problem is the problem of deciding whether a directed graph with weights on the edges (which may be positive or negative or zero) has a cycle in which the sum of weights is 0. 

A related problem is to decide whether the graph has a cycle in which the sum of weights is less than 0. This related problem can be solved in polynomial time using the Bellman–Ford algorithm. In contrast, detecting a cycle of weight exactly 0 is an NP-complete problem. 

The problem is in NP since, given a cycle, it is easy to verify that its weight is 0. 

The proof of NP-hardness is by reduction from the subset sum problem. In this problem we are given a set of numbers, positive and some negative, and have to decide whether there exists a subset whose sum is exactly 0. Given an instance of subset-sum with n numbers, construct an instance of zero-weight-cycle as follows. Construct a graph with 2n vertices. For each number ai the graph contains two vertices: ui and vi. From each ui, there is only one outgoing edge, which goes to vi and has weight ai. From each vi, there are n outgoing edges, which go to each uj and have weights 0. Any cycle in this graph have the form u1-v1-u2-v2-...-uk-vk.   The weight of a cycle is 0, iff the sum of all weights between each ui and its corresponding vi is 0, iff the sum of all corresponding ai is 0, iff there is a subset with a sum of 0.

References

External links 

 
 

NP-complete problems
Graph algorithms